Soueid is a transliteration of various Arabic language surnames. It can refer to:

 Ahmed Ben Soueid, Libyan footballer
 Mohamad Anas Haitham Soueid, Syrian-American convicted of espionage
 Mouhamed Soueid, Mauritanian footballer

See also

 Souaid

Arabic-language surnames